Paul “Doots” Danilo (July 5, 1919 – September 2, 2013) was born in South Fayette Township, Pennsylvania and was a U.S. soccer outside right who played most of his career with amateur teams in western Pennsylvania.  He scored the winning goal in the 1940 National Amateur Cup and later served as a coach and administrator on both the local and national levels.  Danilo is a member of the National Soccer Hall of Fame.

Player
In 1937, Danilo joined the Morgan Soccer Club which competed in the Keystone League.  At the time, western Pennsylvania was one of the dominant regions in U.S. soccer.  Danilo jumped to Heidelberg later in 1937 for a single season before returning to Morgan in 1939.  In 1940, he scored the winning goal as Morgan won the National Amateur Cup final.  In 1946, he signed with the Pittsburgh Indians of the North American Soccer Football League, winning the 1947 league title.  He returned to Morgan the next season and retired from playing in 1952.

Coach and administrator
Danilo became the head coach for Morgan in 1953, a position he held for four seasons.  He also served as secretary and then president of the West Penn Soccer Association and was the Commissioner of both the National Challenge Cup and National Amateur Cup.

Danilo was inducted into the National Soccer Hall of Fame in 1997.  He is the son in-law of Daniel Zampini, also a member of the National Soccer Hall of Fame.

References

External links
 
 
 Team photo of Morgan after 1940 Amateur Cup

1919 births
2013 deaths
People from South Fayette Township, Allegheny County, Pennsylvania
American soccer players
Morgan F.C. players
North American Soccer Football League players
Pittsburgh Indians players
National Soccer Hall of Fame members
Soccer players from Pennsylvania
Association football forwards